Frederick Charles Husenbeth (born at Bristol, 30 May 1796; died at Costessey, Norfolk, 31 October 1872) was an English Catholic priest and writer.

Life 
The son of a Bristol wine-merchant and of a lady of Cornish family, a convert to Catholicism, he was sent at the age of seven to Sedgley Park School in Staffordshire, and at fourteen entered his father's counting-house. Having formed the resolution, three years later, to study for the priesthood, he returned to Sedgley, going afterwards to Oscott College, where he was ordained by John Milner in 1820.

After serving the Stourbridge mission, near Oscott, for a time, he was sent to Cossey Hall, Norfolk, as chaplain to Sir George Stafford Jerningham, who became Baron Stafford in 1825. He took up his residence in a cottage in the village, and continued his ministrations here to the Catholics of the mission until within a few months of his death.

During this long period, extending over more than half a century, he is said to have been absent from his mission only on three Sundays. Seven years after his appointment to Cossey he became grand vicar under Bishop Walsh, successor of Bishop Milner as Vicar Apostolic of the Midland District. In 1841 he opened St. Walstan's Chapel, for which he had collected funds, and in 1850 he received the degree of Doctor of Divinity from Rome.

Shortly after the restoration of the English hierarchy by Pope Pius IX, Husenbeth was nominated provost of the Chapter, of Northampton, and Vicar-General of the diocese. In the spring of 1872 he resigned his mission, and he died at St. Walstan's Presbytery on the last day of October in the same year.

He had no particular liking for religious institutes, and was quite opposed to the new forms of devotion which had grown up since his student days at Oscott.

Works 
In his quiet country presbytery, he found ample leisure time, and between the years 1823 and 1849 forty-nine works written or edited by him appeared in London, Dublin, and Norwich. Many of these were controversial publications, written in refutation of George Stanley Faber and Joseph Blanco White, while others treated of historical, liturgical, or doctrinal matters. Perhaps his most important work is the Life of Bishop Milner, published in 1862; defective as biography, it was a contribution to the history of Catholicism on England.

In 1852 he brought out, assisted by John Polding, a new edition, with abridged notes, of George Leo Haydock's illustrated Bible and he published also editions, for the use of the laity, of the Missal and the vesper-book. The "Emblems of Saints" (1850) was one of his best original works, and the style of his pulpit eloquence is well shown by the various sermons which he printed from time to time.

He contributed a large number of uncollected verses to the periodicals of his time. He also published articles on a great variety of subjects in different Catholic journals, and was a lifelong writer in the columns of Notes and Queries, in which more than thirteen hundred contributions appeared over his initials. He was a voluminous letter-writer, and maintained a correspondence with various literary celebrities, and with many distinguished converts of his time. Husenbeth's valuable library collection of crucifixes, reliquaries and similar objects and of letters chiefly on religious subjects, were sold at Norwich a few months after his death. Most of the letters passed into the possession of the Bishop of Northampton.

References 

 John Dalton, Funeral Sermon (with memoir prefixed) (London, 1872);
 George Oliver, Collection illustrating the History of the Catholic Religion (London, 1857), 331;
 Joseph Gillow, Bibl. Dict. Eng Cath. (London), III, 493 sqq.:
 The Oscotian, new series, IV, 253; V, 30; Vl, 59;
 The Tablet, XL, 593, 628;
 Notes and Queries, 4th series, X, 365, 388, 441.

External links 
 Catholic Encyclopedia article
 

1796 births
1872 deaths
19th-century English Roman Catholic priests
Alumni of St Mary's College, Oscott
English theologians
Clergy from Bristol
Roman Catholic writers
People from Costessey